"Gaviota traidora" (Traitorous Seagull) is a corrido written by Margarito Estrada and popularized by Mexican singer Flor Silvestre in the mid-1960s.  It was featured in the 1969 film El ojo de vidrio.

References

External links
"Gaviota traidora" at iTunes

Spanish-language songs
1969 songs
Flor Silvestre songs